The Euroa Gazette is a newspaper published weekly in Euroa, Victoria, Australia.

History 
The newspaper was first published on 23 November 1897 by H.A.Gilbert. It was a weekly publication for residents of Euroa, Longwood, Balmattum, Miepoll, Strathbogie, Violet Town,  Kialla, Molka, Moglonemby, Pranjip, Gooram, Merton, Gobur, Ruffy, Tamleugh, Marraweeney, Gowangardie, Avenel, Moorilim, Dargalong, Burnt Creek and Nagambie.

In 1957, The Euroa Gazette absorbed the Euroa Advertiser and The Violet Town Sentinel.

Today The Euroa Gazette is published by North East Media, a division of Provincial Press Group Pty Ltd.

Digitisation 
The newspaper has been digitised as part of the Australian Newspapers Digitisation Program of the National Library of Australia.

See also 
 List of newspapers in Australia

References

External links 
 Euroa Gazette

Newspapers published in Victoria (Australia)
1897 establishments in Australia
Euroa
Weekly newspapers published in Australia